ZERO - The End of Prostate Cancer is a 501(c)(3) non-profit organization dedicated to prostate cancer education, testing, patient support, research and advocacy.

History
The National Prostate Cancer Coalition (NPCC) was founded in 1996 after a task force meeting called by the American Foundation for Urologic Disease (AFUD). The NPCC's stated goal was to unify every major prostate cancer organization in the United States in an effort to, "bring public awareness to the magnitude of prostate cancer and to ultimately eradicate it."

Originally modeled after the National Breast Cancer Coalition, NPCC was created to raise funds for prostate cancer research and increasing public awareness of the disease. Founding members included the American Cancer Society, American Urological Association, and US TOO prostate cancer support network.

In 2008, the organization changed its name to ZERO - The End Prostate Cancer. In 2012 the organization changed its name to ZERO - The End of Prostate Cancer.

Activities
ZERO has operated The Drive Against Prostate Cancer since 2002.
This is a nationwide mobile screening program that provides prostate cancer tests at no charge. Local licensed physicians conduct a two-part early detection procedure, consisting of a prostate-specific antigen (PSA) blood test and a physical examination. Test results are sent to a cancer center for evaluation, and each man receives a notification letter explaining the test results and providing links to information on the web, a toll-free phone number to ZERO, and a contact at the cancer center. Men with abnormal test results receive a second letter urging them to seek medical attention.

The Drive Against Prostate Cancer has traveled to the U. S. Capitol, the New York Stock Exchange, Times Square and major league ballparks, NASCAR races, state fairs, and cities and towns across the U.S. As of September 2009, more than 100,000 men have received prostate cancer tests at no charge through the Drive Against Prostate Cancer program.

Since the introduction of the PSA test in the 1990s as an early detection screening tool for prostate cancer, the prostate cancer death rate has decreased by more than 40 percent.
Due to early detection, more than 90 percent of all prostate cancers are found in a localized stage, before spreading to other areas of the body, and the five-year survival rate for these patients approaches 100 percent.

Retired four-star U.S. Army General Colin Powell, former Secretary of State and also a prostate cancer survivor since his successful treatment in 2003, encourages all men to get regular prostate check-ups in order to protect their health. "Men should have regular prostate examinations," he said. "Black men are more susceptible to the disease than others. Regular exams allowed me to deal with this problem early and make a full recovery."

Notes

External links
 Official site
 American Urological Association
 National Comprehensive Cancer Network

Fundraising
Urology organizations
Cancer charities in the United States
Charities based in Washington, D.C.
Prostate cancer
Organizations established in 1996
1996 establishments in Washington, D.C.
Medical and health organizations based in Virginia